Free TC is the debut studio album by American singer Ty Dolla Sign. It was released on November 13, 2015, by Atlantic Records. As executive producers, Ty Dolla Sign and Wiz Khalifa enlisted a variety of collaborators; including DJ Mustard, DJ Spinz, Cardo, Johnny Juliano, Kendrick Lamar, Brandy, Rae Sremmurd, E-40, Future, and Kanye West, among others.

Free TC received generally positive reviews from critics. The album debuted at number 14 on the US Billboard 200, selling 31,000 units in its first week. It was supported by three singles: "Only Right", "Blasé", and "Saved".

The deluxe version was released on March 25, 2016, which includes four bonus tracks, including the single "Wavy" and three new tracks.

Promotion
On October 13, 2015, while Ty is prepping for the release of Free TC, Ty released his sixth mixtape Airplane Mode. On October 15, the album's final track listing was revealed through his SoundCloud account, in which Ty told his incarcerated brother TC (to whom the album is dedicated) over the phone about each track and how they came up with it together.

Singles
The album's first single, "Only Right", was released on May 15, 2015. The song features guest appearances from American rappers YG, Joe Moses, and TeeCee4800, while the production was handled by Mike Free and DJ Mustard.

The album's lead single, "Blasé", was released on June 26, 2015. The song features guest appearances from American rapper Future and hip hop duo Rae Sremmurd, while the production was handled by DJ Spinz. "Blasé" was sent to radio and the song later charted on the US Billboard Hot 100. On August 2, 2016, it was certified platinum by the Recording Industry Association of America (RIAA).

The album's third single, "Saved", was released on October 16, 2015. The song features a guest appearance from American rapper E-40, while the production was handled by DJ Mustard and Twice as Nice. "Saved" was sent to radio and later charted on the Billboard Hot 100. On July 28, 2016, it was certified gold by the Recording Industry Association of America (RIAA).

The album's fourth single, "Wavy", was released on January 16, 2016. The song features a guest appearance from American rapper Joe Moses, while the production was handled by DJ Mustard and Twice as Nice. On December 7, 2016, "Wavy" was certified gold by the Recording Industry Association of America (RIAA).

Promotional singles
The album's first promotional single, "When I See Ya", was released on September 10, 2015. The song features a guest appearance from American rapper Fetty Wap, while the production was handled by Cardo and Johnny Juliano.

The album's second promotional single, "Solid", was released on October 23, 2015. The song features a guest appearance from American R&B singer-songwriter Babyface, who also serves its production alongside The Rascals, D'Mile, and Ty Dolla Sign.

Critical reception

Free TC was met with generally positive reviews. At Metacritic, which assigns a normalized rating out of 100 to reviews from mainstream publications, the album received an average score of 76, based on 16 reviews. Aggregator AnyDecentMusic? gave it 7.1 out of 10, based on their assessment of the critical consensus.

David Jeffries of AllMusic said, "Numerous proven mixtapes help set Ty up for an easier introduction than most, but Free TC tops all expectations, as the man conquers the club, the bedroom, and the brain with this end-to-end stunner". Brain Josephs of Consequence said, "For all of Free TCs turn-up nut-grabbing, it's the beating heart that ends up stealing the show". Kyle Anderson of Entertainment Weekly said, "Free TC could use some editing, but Ty has enough charm to carry bedroom jams, Cadillac bangers, and folk-funk experiments all at once". In a positive review for Exclaim!, Calum Slingerland praised Ty's talent in composition and arrangement, writing "what could have easily been a 16-track collection of Griffin's ambition becoming his downfall is a worthwhile look at the multifaceted nature of his musical brain". Claire Lobenfeld of Fact said, "This is not the moment where he will become a superstar, but it's a promising beginning to what should be a very long career". Shirley Ju of HipHopDX said, "So, all in all, Ty delivers a light, layered debut, with more depth than we thought could be drawn out of the trap&B sound he helped usher into the mainstream".

Jon Caramanica of The New York Times said, "Free TC—often exceptional, and easily one of the best R&B albums of this year—is elaborate in conception and execution but still feels off the cuff". Rebecca Haithcoat of Pitchfork said, "His confidence is why he flies when he swings for the fences on his new album, Free TC". Corbin Reiff of Rolling Stone said, "Free TC, dedicated to Dolla $ign's currently incarcerated brother, marries a diverse range of earworm-level hooks and genre-bridging rhythms to uncomfortably base themes". Winston Cook-Wilson of Spin said, "The album is a dense, cinematic, always surprising and often moving album that sounds like it required the full three years that the L.A. crooner and producer spent chipping away at it to get right". Lanre Bakare of The Guardian said, "[The] cameo-packed tracks fail to live up to the billing, often feeling too long and lacking the punch of Dolla $ign's previous output".

Rankings

Commercial performance
Free TC debuted at number 14 on the US Billboard 200, with 31,000 album-equivalent units, (including 22,000 copies in pure album sales) in its first week. On February 7, 2018, the album was certified gold by the Recording Industry Association of America (RIAA), for combined sales and album-equivalent units of over 500,000 units in the United States.

Track listing 

Notes
 signifies a co-producer
 signifies an additional producer
 "LA" features additional vocals by Nate Howard and D&D
 "Straight Up" features additional vocals by Jacob Luttrell and outro vocals from Ryan Brady
 "Know Ya" features intro vocals from Keke Palmer
 "Credit" features additional vocals from Micah Powell and Tiffany Gouché, and outro vocals from Big TC and D-Loc
 "Miracle / Whatever" features background vocals by Michah Powell, Angel Gold, and Sevyn Streeter
 "Guard Down" features additional vocals by Nico & Vinz
 "Actress" features outro vocals by French Montana, D-Loc, Big TC, and Malik Yusef
 "Finale" features background vocals from Sunny Bey, Shafiq Husayn, Om'Mas Keith, Taz Arnold, and Stephen "Thundercat" Bruner

Sample credits
 "Straight Up" contains a sample of "Settle For My Love" written by Shereelyn Brown, Patrice Rushen, and Fred Washington, as performed by Patrice Rushen; and interpolation of "Let's Get Married", written by Brandon Casey, Bryan Casey, Bryan-Michael Cox, and Jermaine Dupri, as performed by Jagged Edge.

Personnel
Credits adapted from the album's liner notes.

Musicians

 DJ Battlecat – talkbox (track 1)
 Benjamin Wright – conductor, arranger ritesonian (tracks 1, 4, 6–9)
 Kevin Brandon – bass (tracks 1, 4, 6–9)
 H. L. Estrada – bass (tracks 1, 4, 6–9)
 Peggy Baldwin – cello (tracks 1, 4, 6–9)
 Giovanna Clayton – cello (tracks 1, 4, 6–9)
 Maria Martinez – cello (tracks 1, 4, 6–9)
 Nancy Stein-Ross – cello (tracks 1, 4, 6–9)
 Caroline Buckman – viola (tracks 1, 4, 6–9)
 Jorge Moraga – viola (tracks 1, 4, 6–9)
 Jimbo Ross – viola (tracks 1, 4, 6–9)
 S. L. Smith – viola (tracks 1, 4, 6–9)
 Mark Cargill – violin (concertmaster) (tracks 1, 4, 6–9)
 Richard Adkins – violin (tracks 1, 4, 6–9)
 Minyoung Chang – violin (tracks 1, 4, 6–9)
 Susan Chatman – violin (tracks 1, 4, 6–9)
 Nicole Garcia – violin (tracks 1, 4, 6–9)
 Terry Glenny – violin (tracks 1, 4, 6–9)
 Neel Hammond – violin (tracks 1, 4, 6–9)
 Kathleen Robertson – violin (tracks 1, 4, 6–9)
 Lesa Terry – violin (tracks 1, 4, 6–9)
 C. M. Woods – violin (tracks 1, 4, 6–9)
 Donnie Meadows – production coordination (track 3)
 Tanisha Broadwater – production coordination (track 3)
 The Down Low Horns – horns (tracks 3, 8)
 Tyrone "Pops" Griffin, Sr. – trumpet, flugelhorn (tracks 3, 8), horns (track 8)
 Tim Anderson – saxophone (tracks 3, 8)
 Richard Moorings – trombone (tracks 3, 8)
 Terrace Martin – alto saxophone (track 7), talkbox (track 8)
 Kenny Crouch – piano (tracks 7, 8)
 Mars – additional piano (track 7)
 Benny Blanco – instrumentation (track 10)
 Two Inch Punch – instrumentation (track 10)
 Noah Breakfast – instrumentation (track 10)
 Andrew "McMuffin" Luftman – production coordination (track 10)
 Seih "Mageef" Hussain – production coordination (track 10)
 Mikkel Eriksen – instruments (track 14)
 Tor Hermansen – instruments (track 14)
 Take Blacksmith  – production coordination, executive production (Tim & Danny Music) (track 14)
 Danny D – production coordination, executive production (Tim & Danny Music) (track 14)
 Sam Barsh – keyboards (track 16)
 Daniel Seeff – upright bass (track 16)

Technical

 Dave Kutch – mastering (all tracks)
 Andy Barnes – recording (tracks 1–5, 7–9, 11–13, 15), additional recording (track 10), engineering (track 10)
 Derek "MixedByAli" Ali – mixing (track 1)
 James Royo – mixing (tracks 2, 13)
 Jorge Taveras – mixing assistance (track 2)
 Jean-Marie Horvat – mixing (tracks 3, 5, 7–9, 16)
 Paul Boutin – mixing (track 4)
 Ty Dolla Sign – recording (tracks 6, 12)
 Keke Palmer – recording (track 6)
 John Kercy – mixing (tracks 6, 15)
 Chris "Anger Management" Schlafani – engineer (track 10)
 Serban Ghenea – mixing (track 10)
 John Hanes – engineer (mixing) (track 10)
 Phil Seaford – engineer (mixing) (track 10)
 Jaycen Joshua – mixing (track 11)
 Ryan Kaul – mixing assistance (track 11)
 Seth Firkins – mixing (track 12)
 Victor Luevanos – mixing assistance (track 13)
 Mikkel Eriksen – recording (track 14)
 Miles Walker – recording (track 14)
 Phil Tan – mixing (track 14)
 Daniel Rivera – additional and assistance engineering (track 14)
 Shafiq Husayn – recording (track 16), engineering (track 16)
 DJ Khalil – recording (track 16), engineering (track 16)
 Om'Mas Keith – vocal production (track 16), engineering (track 16)
 Taz Arnold – vocal production (track 16)

Additional personnel

 Danny Zook – sample clearance
 Ron Cahiltes – sample clearance (Alien Music)
 Carolyn Tracey – packaging production
 Virgilio Tzaj – art direction, design
 Jory Lee Cordy – photography

Charts

Weekly charts

Year-end charts

Certifications

Release history

References

2015 debut albums
Ty Dolla Sign albums
Atlantic Records albums
Albums produced by DJ Mustard
Albums produced by Stargate
Albums produced by Cardo
Albums produced by Benny Blanco
Albums produced by Hit-Boy
Albums produced by Metro Boomin
Albums produced by DJ Khalil
Albums produced by Thundercat (musician)